Ball v Johnson was an attempted private prosecution application by Marcus Ball and his company Brexit Justice Limited, on 29 May 2019, against Boris Johnson for three counts of alleged misconduct in public office. The applicants alleged that Johnson "in his position as a Member of Parliament and Mayor of London, abused the public's trust during the 2016 Brexit referendum by lying about the United Kingdom's spending on European Union membership".

Johnson repeatedly claimed that "we will take back control of roughly £350m per week" and subsequently said that the "gross figure by 2022, were we to stay in towards the end of this Parliament, would be £438 million a week." The head of the UK Statistics Authority Sir David Norgrove called the claim "a clear misuse of official statistics". Ball alleges that Johnson knew that these claims were false and made them anyway.

On 23 February the prosecution laid an information of the case at Westminster Magistrates' Court and filed an application for a summons against Johnson. Subsequently a district judge issued a summons against Johnson and set the first hearing for 14 May. The case was thrown out by the High Court in June 2019.

On 3 July 2019 in Johnson v Westminster Magistrates' Court, the Queen's Bench Division (Administrative Court) of the High Court of England and Wales allowed an application for judicial review brought by Johnson against the original decision of the District Judge in Westminster Magistrates' Court. The review quashed the original decision, finding that the District Judge had acted unlawfully in allowing the private prosecution to proceed, and quashed the summons issued for Johnson to appear in court as being unlawfully issued. The court also found that original private prosecution application vexatious in nature.

In December 2019, Ball complained to the Judicial Complaints Investigations Organisation, arguing that members of the judicial review panel had conflicts of interest.

References 

2019 in British politics
Boris Johnson
Brexit